Xu Chang may refer to:
 Xu Chang, leader of a rebellion in the 170s in China
 Xuchang, a city in China